Saison is a San Francisco restaurant that earned the highest rating of three stars from the Michelin Guide in 2014. It is located in the SoMa district. The founders and owners are executive chef Joshua Skenes and wine director Mark Bright.

Awards and honors
4 Stars, San Francisco Magazine
2014-2017 Grand Award, Wine Spectator
2016 ranked 27 in The World's 50 Best Restaurants
2017 ranked 37  among The World's 50 Best Restaurants

See also

List of Michelin starred restaurants in San Francisco Bay Area

References

Restaurants in San Francisco
Michelin Guide starred restaurants in California
2012 establishments in California
Restaurants established in 2012
New American restaurants in California